Kim Ji-min may refer to:

Kim Ji-min (comedian) (born 1984), South Korean female comedian
Kim Ji-min (actress) (born 2000), South Korean actress
Kim Ji-min (footballer, born 1984), South Korean footballer
Kim Ji-min (footballer, born 1993), South Korean footballer